São Luiz (or São Luiz do Anauá) is a municipality located in the southeast of the state of Roraima in Brazil. Its population is 8,110 and its area is 1,527 km2, which makes it the smallest municipality in that state. São Luiz became an independent municipality in 1982. The municipality can be reached by the BR-210 highway.

Sports 
The local football club is Associação Esportiva Real.

References

External links 
Official site (in Portuguese)

Municipalities in Roraima